Harbin Confucius Temple, or Harbin Confucian Temple, is a Confucian temple located on Confucian Temple Street (文庙街), Nangang District (南岗区), Harbin City, Heilongjiang Province. The Temple is a typical building complex imitating the architectural style of the Qing Dynasty.

Located within the courtyard of Harbin Engineering University,  Harbin Confucius Temple is the largest Confucian temple in Northeast China. In the whole of China, its scale is second only to Qufu Confucius Temple and Beijing Confucius Temple.

History
The construction of the Harbin Confucius Temple began in 1926 and was completed in 1929, costing 730,000 Harbin silver dollar notes (哈大洋).

In November 1996, Harbin Confucius Temple was included as the fourth batch of China's Major Historical and Cultural Site Protected at the National Level.

References

Confucian temples in China
Historic sites in China
Cultural heritage of China
Protected areas of China
1929 establishments in China
20th-century Confucian temples
20th-century architecture in China
Religious buildings and structures in China
Traditional Chinese architecture
Major National Historical and Cultural Sites in Heilongjiang